John Ward McIntyre (24 September 1881 – 19 April 1957) was an Australian rules footballer who played with Essendon in the Victorian Football League (VFL).		

He later played with Essendon Association in the Victorian Football Association (VFA).

References

External links 

Jack McIntyre's playing statistics from The VFA Project

1881 births
1957 deaths
Australian rules footballers from Melbourne
Essendon Football Club players
Essendon Association Football Club players
People from West Melbourne, Victoria